Cruciata, a Latin adjective meaning crucified, may refer to:
 Cruciata, a plant genus
 Silvana Cruciata (born 1953), Italian middle- and long-distance runner

See also 
 Cruciatum
 Cruciatus